The 2017 Davis Cup was the 106th edition of the Davis Cup, a tournament between national teams in men's tennis. It was sponsored by BNP Paribas. France won their tenth title (their first since 2001), with Lucas Pouille defeating Steve Darcis of Belgium on indoor hard in the final match held at Stade Pierre-Mauroy located in Villeneuve-d'Ascq on 26 November.

World Group

Seeds

Draw

Final

World Group play-offs

Date: 15–17 September

The eight losing teams in the World Group first round ties and eight winners of the Zonal Group I final round ties competed in the World Group play-offs for spots in the 2018 World Group.

Seeded teams

 
 
 
 
 
 
 
 

Unseeded teams

 
 
 
 
 
 
 
 

Americas Zone

Group I

Seeds: 
All seeds received a bye into the second round.

Remaining nations:

Draw

Group II

Seeds: 

Remaining nations:

Draw

Group III

Date: 12–17 June

Location: Carrasco Lawn Tennis Club, Montevideo, Uruguay (clay)

Format: Round-robin basis. Two pools of four and five teams, respectively (Pools A and B). The winner of each pool plays off against the runner-up of the other pool to determine which two nations are promoted to Americas Zone Group II in 2018.

Participating teams:

Seeding: The seeding was based on the Davis Cup Rankings of 10 April 2017 (shown in parentheses below).

Pool A

Pool B

Playoffs 

 and  promoted to Group II in 2018.

Asia/Oceania Zone

Group I

Seeds: 
The first seed received a bye into the second round.
 
 

Remaining nations:

Draw

Group II

Seeds:
 
 
 
 

Remaining nations:

Draw

Group III

Date: 17–22 July

Location: Sri Lanka Tennis Association, Colombo, Sri Lanka (clay)

Participating teams:

Format: Round-robin basis. Two pools of four and five teams, respectively (Pools A and B). The winner of each pool plays off against the runner-up of the other pool to determine which two nations are promoted to Asia/Oceania Zone Group II in 2018.

Seeding: The seeding was based on the Davis Cup Rankings of 10 April 2017 (shown in parentheses below).

Pool A

Pool B

Playoffs 

  and  promoted to Group II in 2018.
  and  relegated to Group IV in 2018.

Group IV

Date: 3–8 April

Location: Bahrain Polytechnic, Isa Town, Bahrain (hard)

Format: Round-robin basis. Two pools of five and six teams, respectively (Pools A and B). The winner of each pool plays off against the runner-up of the other pool to determine which two nations are promoted to Asia/Oceania Zone Group III in 2018.

Participating teams:

Seeding: The seeding was based on the Davis Cup Rankings of 20 February 2017 (shown in parentheses below).

Pool A

Pool B

Play-offs 

 and  promoted to Group III in 2018.

Europe/Africa Zone

Group I

Seeds: 
All seeds and  received a bye into the second round.
 
 
 
  

Remaining nations:

Draw

Group II

Seeds: 
 
 
 
 
 
 
 
 

Remaining nations:

Draw

Group III Europe

Date: 5–8 April

Location: Holiday Village Santa Marina, Sozopol, Bulgaria (hard)

Format: Round-robin basis. One pool of three teams (Pool A) and three pools of four teams (Pools B, C and D). The winners of each pool played-off against each other to determine which two nations were promoted to Europe/Africa Zone Group II in 2018.

Participating teams:

Seeding: The seeding was based on the Davis Cup Rankings of 20 February 2017 (shown in parentheses below).

Pool A

Pool B

Pool C

Pool D

Playoffs 

 and  promoted to Group II in 2018.

Group III Africa

Date: 17–22 July

Location: Solaimaneyah Club, Cairo, Egypt (clay)

Format: Round-robin basis. Two pools of four and five teams, respectively (Pools A and B). The winner of each pool plays off against the runner-up of the other pool to determine which two nations are promoted to Asia/Oceania Zone Group II in 2018.

Participating teams:

Seeding: The seeding was based on the Davis Cup Rankings of 10 April 2017 (shown in parentheses below).

Pool A

Pool B

Playoffs 

  and  promoted to Group II in 2018.

Broadcasting rights

Americas 
 : TyC Sports and América Sports
 : SporTV and BandSports 
 : Sportsnet and TVA Sports 
 :  and  
 : 
 : Tennis Channel

Asia

Europe 
 : RTBF, Sporza and VRT
 : beIN SPORTS
 : MTVA
 : Super Tennis
 : TVP Sport
 : SPORT.TV4
 : Match! Arena and Match! Game
 : Radio Television of Serbia

Africa

References

External links
Official website

 
Davis Cup
Davis Cups by year